I Musici de Montréal is a Canadian chamber orchestra, founded in 1984 by cellist and conductor Yuli Turovsky.

About 
I Musici de Montréal Chamber Orchestra has been sharing its passion for classical music for over 35 years. The 15 exceptional musicians who make up the orchestra bring to life a varied repertoire ranging from the 17th century to the present day, accompanied by their principal guest conductor and artistic advisor Jean-François Rivest. Their extraordinary amount of activity places I Musici de Montréal among the most important touring orchestras in Canada.

With a program based on tradition, originality and innovation, the Orchestra stands out for the place it gives to numerous emerging and renowned artists with whom it partners to offer you a colorful and meaningful musical experience. I Musici de Montréal has built a solid reputation thanks to its numerous international tours and 40 recordings that meet the highest standards. The Orchestra also acts as a creative catalyst within the city of Montreal and continues to strengthen its roots in the community by collaborating with various organizations and schools on its territory.

Under the dynamic and visionary direction of Maestro Yuli Turovsky, who also performed as cello soloist with the orchestra, I Musici de Montréal has performed in some of the greatest halls in the world: New York's Lincoln Center and Carnegie Hall, the Gewandhaus in Leipzig, the Seiji Ozawa Hall in Tanglewood, the Tonhalle in Zürich, the Palais des Beaux-Arts in Brussels, the Kioi Hall in Tokyo and the Conservatoire de Musique in Luxembourg, among others. Public enthusiasm and critical acclaim underlining the precision, cohesion and virtuosity of their performance as well as the brilliant and distinctive sound of the orchestra confirm I Musici de Montréal's importance on the world's musical stage.

From 2011 to 2020 the principal conductor of I Musici de Montréal has been Jean-Marie Zeitouni.

In 2020, Jean-François Rivest. was appointed the role of artistic advisor and principal guest conducteur.

Awards 
Since its beginnings, I Musici de Montréal has released more than 40 CDs for the Chandos and Analekta Record Labels that are distributed in more than 50 countries around the world. These recordings have won the orchestra and Maestro Turovsky many awards, including a Diapason d’Or for their 1988 recording of Dmitri Shostakovich's 14th Symphony and a 1992 Penguin Guide Rosette for their Concerti grossi, Op. 6 by George Frideric Handel. I Musici de Montréal's recording of Handel has since become a reference recording of the highest standard.

In December 1998, the Conseil Québécois de la Musique gave two Opus Awards to the orchestra for Recording Event of the Year and Best Recording - contemporary music for a CD grouping works by Henryk Górecki, Arvo Pärt and Alfred Schnittke. In 1999, I Musici de Montréal was awarded the Grand Prix by the Montreal Urban Community for their exceptional contribution to music presentation in and around Montreal. 

In August 2001, BBC Music Magazine named as their CD of the Month I Musici de Montréal's 40th CD, a recording of Nikolai Myaskovsky, Schnittke and Edison Denisov, calling it a Russian tour de force. In April 2002, I Musici was nominated for another Canadian Juno Award as Best Classical Album of the Year, this after having won a Juno for their recording of Alberto Ginastera, Heitor Villa-Lobos and José Evangelista.

References

External links
Official website
L'agence d'À Côté

Canadian orchestras
Chamber orchestras
Musical groups from Montreal
Musical groups established in 1983
Juno Award for Classical Album of the Year – Large Ensemble or Soloist(s) with Large Ensemble Accompaniment winners
1983 establishments in Quebec